The 2003–04 AHL season was the 68th season of the American Hockey League. The league introduced the Willie Marshall Award in honor of the career points leader in the AHL, and awards it to the annual top goal scorer.

The AHL switched from a six division alignment to four divisions within two conferences. The Eastern conference consisted of the Atlantic and East divisions, and the Western conference consisted of the North and West divisions. Twenty-eight teams played 80 games each in the schedule. The Milwaukee Admirals finished first overall in the regular season, and won the Calder Cup, defeating the Wilkes-Barre/Scranton Penguins in the finals.

Team changes
The Saint John Flames suspend operations, becoming dormant.
The Hamilton Bulldogs and Quebec Citadelles merger dissolves, remaining as a Montreal Canadiens affiliate.
The Edmonton Oilers affiliation resumed operations as the Toronto Roadrunners, based in Toronto, Ontario, playing in the North division.
All teams playing in the 2002-03 North Division (Lowell Lock Monsters, Manchester Monarchs, Portland Pirates, Providence Bruins and Worcester IceCats) play in the new Atlantic Division.
The Hartford Wolf Pack and Springfield Falcons switch from the 2002-03 East Division to the new Atlantic Division.
All teams playing in the 2002-03 South Division (Hershey Bears, Norfolk Admirals, Philadelphia Phantoms and Wilkes-Barre/Scranton Penguins) play in the new East Division.
The Albany River Rats, Binghamton Senators and Bridgeport Sound Tigers continue to play in the (new) East Division.
The Hamilton Bulldogs, Manitoba Moose and St. John's Maple Leafs switch from the Canadian Division to the new North Division.
The Cleveland Barons, Rochester Americans and Syracuse Crunch switch from the Central Division to the new North Division.
All teams playing in the 2002-03 West Division (Chicago Wolves, Houston Aeros, Milwaukee Admirals, San Antonio Rampage and Utah Grizzlies) continue to play in the West Division.
The Cincinnati Mighty Ducks and Grand Rapids Griffins switch from the Central Division to the new West Division.

Final standings
Note: GP = Games played; W = Wins; L = Losses; T = Ties; OTL = Overtime losses; GF = Goals for; GA = Goals against; PTS = Points;

Eastern Conference

Western Conference

Scoring leadersNote: GP = Games played; G = Goals; A = Assists; Pts = Points; PIM = Penalty minutes''

Calder Cup Playoffs

All Star Classic
The 17th AHL All-Star Classic was played on February 9, 2004, at the Van Andel Arena in Grand Rapids, Michigan. Team Canada defeated team PlanetUSA 9-5. In the skills competition held the night before, team PlanetUSA defeated team Canada 18-9.

Trophy and award winners

Team awards

Individual awards

Other awards

See also
List of AHL seasons

References

External links
AHL official site
AHL Hall of Fame
HockeyDB
Calder Cup Playoffs @ manitobamoose.com

 
American Hockey League seasons
2
2